Cochemiea mainiae is a species of cactus in the subfamily Cactoideae, with the common name counterclockwise nipple cactus.

References

Plants described in 1900
mainiae